Rubicon: The Last Years of the Roman Republic, or Rubicon: The Triumph and Tragedy of the Roman Republic, is a popular history book written by Tom Holland, published in 2003.

The book tells the story of the end of the Roman Republic and the consequent establishment of the Roman Empire. The book takes its title from the river Rubicon in the northern Italian peninsula. In 49 BC, Julius Caesar crossed this river with his army and marched on Rome, breaking a sacred law of the Roman Republic and throwing the nation into a civil war.

Reception

The book won the 2004 Hessell-Tiltman Prize. The Hessell-Tiltman prize is awarded annually for a non-fiction book of specifically historical content. Entrants are to be books of high literary merit – that is, not primarily written for the academic market – and can cover all historical periods.

The Observer described the book as "a modern, well-paced and finely observed history which entertains as it informs... That he makes a complicated historical period comprehensible is a tribute to broad research." A reviewer in the German Damals magazine wrote that while the book contributed nothing essentially new it was still an asset for bringing a whole era back to life in a sovereign and coherent manner. Rubicon has received favorable reviews from the Houston Chronicle, The Seattle Times, the Los Angeles Times, and others.

References

2003 non-fiction books
History books about ancient Rome
Works about Julius Caesar